Huskisson Dock was a railway station on the Liverpool Overhead Railway, adjacent to the dock of the same name. It was primarily used for access to the passenger liners, particularly those of Cunard and Ellerman.

It was opened in May 1896 and replaced nearby Sandon Dock station, which was closed at the same time.

The station closed, along with the rest of the line on 30 December 1956. No evidence of this station remains.

References

External links
 Huskisson Dock station on Subterranea Britannica

Disused railway stations in Liverpool
Former Liverpool Overhead Railway stations
Railway stations in Great Britain opened in 1896
Railway stations in Great Britain closed in 1956